Barnabás Ferkó (29 April 1956 31 December 2022) was an ethnic Hungarian Slovak politician, who served as a Member of the National Council between 1994 and 2002. He was a member of the Party of the Hungarian Coalition.

After leaving politics, he worked as the Director of policlinic in Veľké Kapušany.

References 

1956 births
2022 deaths
Party of the Hungarian Community politicians
Members of the National Council (Slovakia) 1994-1998
Members of the National Council (Slovakia) 1998-2002
Hungarians in Slovakia
People from Michalovce District